Lukas Neumayer (born 6 September 2002) is an Austrian tennis player.

Neumayer has a career high ATP singles ranking of 292 achieved on 17 October 2022. He also has a career high ATP doubles ranking of 492 achieved on 18 July 2022.

Neumayer made his ATP main draw debut at the 2021 Generali Open Kitzbühel after qualifying for the singles main draw.

On February 13, 2022 he won his first Futures Tournament (M15 Antalya). In the final he beat Martin Cuevas from Uruguay.

ATP Challenger and ITF World Tennis Tour finals

Singles: 3 (3–0)

References

External links

2002 births
Living people
Austrian male tennis players
Sportspeople from Salzburg
People from Radstadt